V. Walter Odajnyk (April 10, 1938 – May 22, 2013) was a Jungian analyst, author and a university professor.

Life and career

Early years
Volodymyr Walter Odajnyk was born in Ostrava, Czechoslovakia, of Ukrainian parents. They survived the war. Several months after the Communist coup d'état in 1948, he and his parents left Czechoslovakia with the aid of the U. S. Army. After a year in Austria, they arrived in the United States.

In 1961 at Hunter College in New York he obtained his B.A., followed in 1963 by an M.A. at the University of California, Berkeley. He specialized in political science and philosophy. In 1965 his thesis was published, Marxism and Existentialism. It discusses Jean-Paul Sartre and contains a chapter on his then-recent work, Critique de la raison dialectique (1960).

In 1970 Odajnyk obtained his Ph.D. in Political Science from Columbia University in New York. For five years he was first  a lecturer, then Assistant Professor of Political Science at Columbia. He spoke then at Harvard University on foreign policy.

Work in psychology
His 1976-book Jung and Politics grew out of his March 1973 article in the American Political Science Review. A stance attributed to him, characterized as asserting that political theory is largely subsumed by psychological elements, was criticized. Marie-Louise von Franz wrote the book's Forward. Ojadnyk has chapters on the origin of culture, distortions due to psychic inflation, era of mass society, the individual, and role of the unconscious. Attention is given to the German case. In his comparative discussion of Jung and Freud (pp. 134-181), he mentions Reich, also Marcuse, Adorno, Fromm. 

His Jungian analyst diploma in 1976 was from the C. G. Jung Institute, Zürich. He then practiced as an analyst in New York City. He served, at the C. G. Jung Institute of New York, on the faculty and as a board member. He co-edited Quadrant: Journal of the C.G. Jung Foundation for Analytical Psychology.

His 1993-book Gathering the Light explores Jungian understandings of meditation. It addressed Jung's uneasiness about a direct adoption by the west of eastern practices, without adequately contextualizing the approach. Separate chapters discuss the experience, Zen practice, and then compare Alchemy; also: western mysticism and Active Imagination. For the stages of Zazen, Odajnyk follows the well-known Ox and Herder illustrations. Appendices critique Ken Wilber on archetypes and Thomas Cleary on The Secret of the Golden Flower.  

From 2002 to 2013 Dr. Odajnyk was a core faculty member of the Mythological Studies Program, at the Pacifica Graduate Institute in Santa Barbara, California. He became licensed as a research psychoanalyst by the Medical Board of California. He was also a supervising analyst associated with the C.G. Jung Study Center of Southern California.

In his 2012-book Archetype and Character, he presented several innovative understandings. He built on foundations begun by Jung in his Psychological Types (1921), and in his prior manuscript (1913-1917) published later as The Red Book (2009).

During his last years he was especially interested in Egyptian mythology. For example, in working to explicate the ancient lore of Isis and Osiris, he included an alchemical process for the creation of the diamond body, graced with immortality.

Family, Memorial
He was survived by his wife Katherine Odesmith, and son Alex. 

A memorial scholarship was established at Pacifica in his honor.

Books, articles
Marxism and Existentialism (Doubleday Anchor 1965) 
Jung and Politics. The Political and Social Ideas of C.G. Jung (New York University & Harper 1976, reprint iUniverse 2007) 
Gathering the Light. A psychology of meditation (Shambhala 1993, reprint Fisher King 2011)
Archetype and Character. Power, Eros, Spirit, and Matter. Personality Types (Palgrave Macmillan 2012)

"The political ideas of C. G. Jung", in American Political Science Review, v.67, n.1 (March 1973). Accessed 31-10-2020.
"Gathering the Light. A Jungian exploration of the psychology of meditation", in Quadrant, v.21, n.1 (1988)
"Meditation and Alchemy. Images of the Goal in East and West", in Psychological Perspectives, issue 22 (Spring 1990) 
"Zazen. A psychological exploration", in Psychological Perspectives, v.25 (Fall-Winter 1991)
"Zen meditation as a way of individuation and healing", in Psychological Perspectives, v.37/1 (1998)
"Archetypal interpretation of fairy tales: Bluebeard", in Psychological Perspectives, v.47/2 (2004)
"The Red Book as the source of Jung's Psychological Types", in Psychological Perspectives, v.56/3 (2013), posthumous. Accessed 1-11-2020.

References

Jungian psychologists
psychology writers
Carl Jung
American psychology writers
Columbia Graduate School of Arts and Sciences alumni
University of California, Berkeley alumni
Hunter College alumni
1938 births
2013 deaths